Nani may refer to:

People
Nanai people of north Asia
Nani (actor) (born 1984), Indian actor
Nani (footballer) (born 1986), Portuguese footballer
Antonio Nani (1842–1929), Maltese classical composer
Gianluca Nani (born 1962), former technical director at West Ham United
Kesineni Srinivas also known as Nani, Indian politician
Kodali Nani, Indian politician
Nanabhoy Palkhivala (1920–2002), Indian jurist and economist
Nani Roma (born 1972) a Spanish rally racing driver
Nani Alapai (1874–1928), Hawaiian soprano vocalist

Places
Nani, Afghanistan

Other uses
Nani Pelekai, a character from the 2002 animated Disney film, Lilo & Stitch, and its franchise